Thomas Ashe (1885–1917) was a member of the Gaelic League.

Thomas Ashe may also refer to:

Thomas Ashe (writer) (1770–1835), Irish novelist
Thomas Ashe (legal writer) (c. 1556–1618), English legal writer
 Thomas Ashe (poet) (1836–1889), English poet
Thomas Samuel Ashe (1812–1887), U.S. Congressman and judge
 Thomas Ashe (footballer) (1920–1997), Scottish footballer